"A Simple Enquiry" is a short story written by Ernest Hemingway. It was published in 1927 in the collection Men Without Women and is notable for its focus on homosexuality.

Synopsis
Three Italian soldiers are snowbound. The senior soldier, the Major, calls a 19-year-old orderly into his room and asks whether he had ever loved a woman. Most critics interpret the ensuing conversation as the major propositioning the orderly. When his questions are rebuffed, he dismisses the orderly from the room with the understanding that he will not press the issue. The major questions to himself whether the orderly was telling the truth.

Characters
 The major
 Tonani, an adjutant
 Pinin, the major's orderly

References

External links
 Full text of "A Simple Enquiry" at HathiTrust Digital Library
 

Short stories by Ernest Hemingway
1927 short stories